Dejumo Lewis  (born 1943) is a Nigerian film and television actor, famous for the Kabiyesi role in The Village Headmaster, Nigeria’s longest-running television soap opera shown on NTA from 1968 to 1988 that stars Justus Esiri and Femi Robinson.

References

Living people
1943 births
Nigerian male film actors
Male actors from Lagos State
Nigerian dramatists and playwrights
Yoruba male actors
20th-century Nigerian male actors
21st-century Nigerian male actors
Male actors in Yoruba cinema
Nigerian male television actors